Agnes Jónsdóttir (died 1507), was the abbess of the Benedictine convent Reynistaðarklaustur in Iceland 1461–1507.

Agnes Jónsdóttir was the daughter of the official Jóns Jónssonar búlands and the sister of the abbot Jóns Sigmundssonar lögmanns. She became a member of the order in 1431, and was confirmed as abbess in 1461. During her tenure, she was involved in a conflict with the Bishop of Holar, Ólafs Rögnvaldssonar.

References
„„Reynistaðarklaustur“. Tímarit Hins íslenska bókmenntafélags, 8. árg. 1887.“,
„„Reynistaðarklaustur“. Sunnudagsblað Tímans, 6. ágúst 1967.“,
Sigríður Gunnarsdóttir: Nunnuklaustrið að Reynistað. Smárit Byggðasafns Skagfirðinga.

15th-century Icelandic women
16th-century Icelandic women
1507 deaths
Year of birth missing
Benedictine abbesses
15th-century Christian nuns
16th-century Roman Catholic nuns